Carol Jiani (born Uchenna Carol Ikejiani) is a Nigerian-born singer based in the United Kingdom, best known for her 1981 hit "Hit 'N Run Lover".

Career
Uchenna Carol Ikejiani was born in Nigeria to an Igbo family.  She moved to Canada as a college student in the mid-1970s. 

In autumn 1978, she auditioned to appear on Joe La Greca's album Montreal. In early 1978, Jiani recorded two tracks for the project, "If You Believe in Me" and "Higher and Higher". These were released on an EP, with her credited under her birth name. Glenn LaRusso of Salsoul Records convinced her to shorten her name from Uchenna Ikejiani to Carol Jiani Carol her middle name to make it easier for North Americans to pronounce.

In 1980, Carol Jiani recorded two Sandy Wilbur-written pieces with La Greca, "Hit 'N Run Lover" and "All The People of the World". "Hit 'N Run Lover" was remixed by San Francisco-based Moby Dick Records for their Gold Standard imprint and would become Jiani's signature song, peaking at number 4 on the US Billboard Club Play Singles chart in 1981. On the heels of "Hit N Run Lover"'s success, Matra Records commissioned a complete album, also titled Hit 'N Run Lover. "The Woman in Me" was the album's second single but its B-side, the uptempo "Mercy", written by Pete Bellotte and Sylvester Levay which exceeded the A-side in popularity among DJs becoming another hit for Jiani. "Mercy", the only track on the album not composed by Sandy Wilbur, was recorded earlier by Judy Cheeks. A follow-up album, Ask Me was released the next year generating the singles "Ask Me", "X-Rated" and "You're Gonna Lose My Love". In 1982, Jiani recorded vocals for "Get Up and Do It Again". The song was a hit, as was the second version recorded by Mizz lead singer, Michelle Mills.

At the end of 1983, she released her last Joe LaGreca production, "Touch And Go Lover" for the Canadian label Telescope. The song was also remixed by Step Pettibone and for the US by John Robie. A total of 7 songs was recorded but the album was not released. Two more singles were released, "Dancing In The Rain" and a cover of "Don't Leave Me This Way". Eventually all songs were released in 1984 on a 12" in the UK by the label Streetwave.

In 1984, Jiani moved to England and soon signed with Record Shack to record "Vanity" with producer Ian Levine. Barbara Pennington had previously recorded the track but declined to release it to focus exclusively on soul music. Jiani's "Vanity", released in 1985, was a hit reaching number 1 on the UK Hi-NRG Club chart. Levine secured her a deal with MCA Records, and she released "Such A Joy Honey". According to Levine, "Turning My Back And Walking Away" was to have been her second single for MCA until she was dropped from the label. MCA gave the recording to Levine and the single was quickly released by his Nightmare Records label in 1987. Levine and Jiani went on to produce a full album for Hot Records, The Best of Carol Jiani, featuring a re-recording of "Hit 'N Run Lover", as well as brand new material.

Jiani returned to Canada to again work with Joe La Greca on her 1996 album, Superstar. It produced two singles, "Come and Get Your Love" and "Superstar".

After Superstar, Jiani maintained a low-profile and released few recordings until the late 2000s, when she made another comeback by working with contemporary dance music producers like Laurent Pautrat and Mondo. Jiani also reunited with Ian Levine to provide vocals on the track "Work My Fingers to the Bone" for his album Northern Soul 2007. Levine and Jiani also recorded a cover of France Joli's "Come To Me".

Early 2008 saw Carol Jiani recording new material with producers Chris Richards & Peter Wilson. One of the first songs to emerge, "I Don't Wanna Talk About Love", featured on the Klone Records compilation, Mad About The Boy 16. In May 2010, "Broken", Jiani's collaboration with Jimmy D Robinson, peaked at No. 9 on Music Week'''s UK Upfront Club chart.

12 June 2015, Carol Jiani on vocals in Jason Parker Meets Naxwell feat. Carol Jiani "Hold That Sucker Down" 2018: "Deeper Love" Phoenix Lord Feat Carol Jiani.2018 "No More" Carol Jiani Feat  Edge.

Discography

Albums

EP'sMontreal, Featuring Uchenna Ikejiani'', Salsoul Records SA 8519 (1978)

Singles
 1981: "Hit 'N Run Lover"
 1981: "The Woman in Me" / "Mercy"
 1982: "Ask Me"
 1982 "You're Gonna Lose My Love"
 1982: "X-Rated"
 1984: "Dancing in the Rain"
 1984: "Touch and Go Lover"
 1984: "Love Now Pay Later"
 1985: "Don't Leave Me This Way"
 1985: "Vanity"
 1987: "Such A Joy Honey"
 1987: "Turning My Back and Walking Away"
 1988: "Hit 'N Run Lover '88"
 1988: "Funkin' For The UK" with 3 Man Island
 1989: "Car Wash" with 3 Man Island
 1990: "It Should Have Been Me"
 1990: "No Matter Where"
 1994: "I Didn't Know"
 1995: "Come and Get Your Love"
 1995: "Superstar"
 1996: "Kiss You All Over"
 2000: "Hit 'N Run Lover 2000"
 2000: "The Queen"
 2005: "It's Raining Men"
 2006: "Hit'n Run Lover 2006"
 2007: "Somebody Else's Guy"
 2007: "Stop the Music" with Laurent Pautrat
 2007: "You've Changed" with Tommaso da Prato
 2007: "First Time I Saw You" with Jazz Voice
 2007: "Ask Me" with Mauzio Verbeni
 2007: "Keep On" with House Bros
 2008: "Never Knew Love" with Frank Savannah
 2008: "Fascinated" with Mondo
 2008: "Set Me Free" feat. DJ N Joy
 2008: "Hit 'N Run Lover" with Didier Vanelli
 2008: "No More Chances" with Mad'ness & Yuri Presents My Lover
 2008: "You Are the One" with Stan Courtois
 2008: "I Don't Wanna Talk About Love"
 2008: "Are You Man Enough?" (duet with Evelyn Thomas)
 2009: "I Am What I Am"
 2009: "Fighting Fire With Fire"
 2009: "Radio Active Love" (with Paul James)
 2009: "Let Me Show You" (with Viken Mardikian)
 2010: "Broken" (written and produced by Jimmy D. Robinson)
 2011: "No More"
 2015: "Hold That Sucker Down"
 2018: "A Deeper Love" Phoenix Lord Feat Carol Jiani
 2018: "No More" Carol Jiani Feat Edge Produced and Mixed by Seanzbeatz
 2019: "Who's The Diva" Sanny X feat Carol Jiani with remixes from Paul Sawyer and The Cloudshapers
 2021: "Fascinated" Phoenix Lord Feat. Carol Jiani

References

External links
 – Carol Jiani's Official Myspace

British hi-NRG musicians
Igbo musicians
Living people
20th-century Nigerian women singers
Women in electronic music
Year of birth missing (living people)
21st-century Nigerian women singers